The Ilimba drum is a musical instrument from Zimbabwe.  The body of the drum is made from the hard outer shell of a gourd.

Sources
Dorling Kindersley, Children's World Atlas, DK Children, 2 June 2008, 

African drums
Gourd musical instruments
Zimbabwean musical instruments